Sir Edmund St John Debonnaire John Monson, 3rd Baronet, KCMG (9 September 1883 – 16 April 1969), was a British diplomat who was ambassador to several countries.

Career
Monson was the second son of Sir Edmund Monson, 1st Baronet, and succeeded his elder brother to the baronetcy created in 1905 for his father (also a diplomat).  He was educated at Eton College

He entered the British diplomatic service in 1906 and served in junior capacities in Constantinople, Tokyo, Paris and Tehran. He was promoted to Embassy Counsellor in 1923. In 1926, he was appointed Minister to Colombia. This was followed by the same post in Mexico from 1929 to 1934, and to the Baltic states from 1934 to 1937. He was Minister to Sweden from 1938 to 1939.  He was knighted KCMG in the New Year Honours of 1938 on his appointment to Sweden, two years after succeeding his brother to the baronetcy.

Footnotes

External links
MONSON, Sir Edmund St John Debonnaire John, Who Was Who, A & C Black, 1920–2008; online edn, Oxford University Press, Dec 2012
Sir Gilbert Falkingham Clayton, An Arabian Diary 1969), 339.
Burke's Peerage (1939 edition), 1762.

1883 births
1969 deaths
People educated at Eton College
Baronets in the Baronetage of the United Kingdom
Ambassadors of the United Kingdom to Sweden
Ambassadors of the United Kingdom to Mexico
Ambassadors of the United Kingdom to Latvia
Ambassadors of the United Kingdom to Lithuania
Ambassadors of the United Kingdom to Estonia
Ambassadors of the United Kingdom to Colombia
Knights Commander of the Order of St Michael and St George